Adolf Ehrecke (14 January 1900 – 12 April 1980) was a German schoolteacher and Nazi Party official who served as the Gauleiter in the Saar from 1929 to 1931 when it was being administered by France and the United Kingdom under a League of Nations mandate.

Biography 
Adolf Ehrecke was born Ochsenfurt in Bavaria and attended the Marine Technical School for Administration and Economics. He became a member of the Nazi Party Ortsgruppe (Local Group) in Nuremberg on 1 April 1925 (membership number 458). His early entry into the Party would later entitle him to be awarded the Golden Party Badge. He joined the Sturmabteilung (SA), the Party's paramilitary organization, in 1926. He advanced in the Party organization, being named an Ortsgruppenleiter in 1929. Also in 1929, he was appointed a Studienassessor (probationary teacher in the civil service) but, later that year, the Governing Commission of the Saar suspended him from this teaching position for political agitation. 

Ehrecke was appointed to the post of Gauleiter in the Saar by Adolf Hitler on 31 July 1929, succeeding the Acting Gauleiter, Gustav Staebe. At the Nuremberg rally (1-4 August 1929) Hitler charged Ehrecke with reorganizing and reinvigorating the Party organization in the Saar region. Over the following two years, under Ehrecke's leadership, the local group grew and became more active than under his predecessors. On 1 June 1930, he became an early member of the National Socialist Teachers League (membership number 252). However, on 31 March 1931, due to his involvement in anti-Semitic propaganda, he was officially expelled from the educational service by the Saar's Governing Commission. This was followed on 20 June 1931 by denial of a residence permit and his expulsion from the Saar territory by the Governing Commission. On 1 September 1931, at his own request, Ehrecke formally stepped down from his Gauleiter position and was succeeded by Karl Brück.

Moving to Kiel in Germany, he obtained a teaching position and was employed from 1931 through 1944 as an educator there and in Görlitz, where he also became a member of the Stadtschulrat (City School Board). From 1944 to 1945, he was an official of the School Supervision Service for Elementary and Middle Schools in the occupied Netherlands, under Reichskommissar Artur Seyss-Inquart. Little is known of his postwar life, and he died in Inzell in 1980.

References

Sources

External links 
Ehrecke entry in Saarland Biography

1900 births
1980 deaths
Gauleiters
German schoolteachers
Nazi Party officials
Sturmabteilung personnel
People from Ochsenfurt